William J. Hawkins House, also known as Oakley Hall, is a historic plantation house located near Ridgeway, Warren County, North Carolina.  It was built about 1855, and is a two-story, three bay by two bay, Greco-Italianate style frame dwelling.  It has a hipped roof with deep overhang and brackets and sits on a basement. The house's design and ornamentation reflect the influences of local builder Jacob W. Holt.

The original owner William J. Hawkins served as president of the Raleigh and Gaston Railroad from 1855 until 1875. The home was listed on the National Register of Historic Places in 1978.

References

Plantation houses in North Carolina
Houses on the National Register of Historic Places in North Carolina
Greek Revival houses in North Carolina
Italianate architecture in North Carolina
Houses completed in 1855
Houses in Warren County, North Carolina
National Register of Historic Places in Warren County, North Carolina